Calcium sorbate is the calcium salt of sorbic acid. Calcium sorbate is a polyunsaturated fatty acid salt. 

It is a commonly used food preservative; its E number is E203, but it is no longer allowed to be used in the European Union.

References

External links
 Calcium sorbate, UKfoodguide.net

Calcium compounds
Sorbates
E-number additives